Fenristunga is a sloping field of ice within the rock walls of hairpin-shaped Fenriskjeften Mountain, in the Drygalski Mountains of Queen Maud Land, Antarctica. It was mapped from surveys and air photos by the Sixth Norwegian Antarctic Expedition (1956–60) and named Fenristunga (Fenrir's tongue) in association with Fenriskjeften Mountain.

References 

Ice fields of Antarctica
Bodies of ice of Queen Maud Land
Princess Astrid Coast